Paul Augé (4 July 1881, L'Isle-Jourdain – 23 July 1951, Cabourg) was a 20th-century French publisher, romanist and lexicographer. In 1920, Paul Augé took over  the publishing of the dictionary and lexicum of the Éditions Larousse from his father Claude Augé.

Editions 
 from 1927 to 1933: édition du deuxième grand dictionnaire du XXe, Larousse du XX, six volumes édition
 1936: Grand Mémento
 1948: Nouveau Larousse universel

References

External links 

French publishers (people)
French lexicographers
French encyclopedists
1881 births
People from Gers
1951 deaths
20th-century lexicographers